Atagema alba, common name the hunchback doris, is a species of sea slug or dorid nudibranch, a marine gastropod mollusk in the family Discodorididae.

Distribution 
This species has been reported from Monterey Bay, California, USA south to Ensenada, Baja California, Mexico.

Description

Ecology
This dorid nudibranch feeds on sponges.

References

Discodorididae
Gastropods described in 1927